Sándor Zöld (19 May 1913 – 20 April 1951) was a Hungarian communist politician, who served as interior minister between 1950 and 1951. He followed János Kádár in this position.

Born in Nagyvárad (today Oradea, Romania), his family moved to Berettyóújfalu after the signing of the Treaty of Trianon. In 1932 he joined to the illegal Communist Party with supporting of Gyula Kállai. From 1942 he worked as a physician in the Berettyóújfalu hospital. He was a member of the interim national assembly in Debrecen at the end of the Second World War.

In the Rákosi regime, he was appointed as interior minister. On 19 April 1951, on the party's congress, Mátyás Rákosi criticized the work of the Ministry of the Interior and later considered to have him arrested. The next day the authorities found Zöld's dead body together with those of his whole family: two children, his wife and his mother. According to the official information, Zöld killed his family then committed suicide. He was relieved of his interior ministerial position on the day of his death, and he was deprived of his offices in the Hungarian Working People's Party. His ashes were buried in an honorary grave in the Kerepesi Cemetery on 1 June 1957, but the accurate clarification of the bygones was canceled.

References
 Magyar Életrajzi Lexikon

1913 births
1951 deaths
People from Oradea
Hungarian people of German descent
Hungarian Communist Party politicians
Members of the Hungarian Working People's Party
Hungarian Interior Ministers
Members of the National Assembly of Hungary (1945–1947)
Members of the National Assembly of Hungary (1947–1949)
Members of the National Assembly of Hungary (1949–1953)
Hungarian politicians who committed suicide
Suicides in Hungary